The Pamplonita River is the main river of the Colombian city of Cúcuta and one of the most important of the Norte de Santander Department.

The Pamplonita River was used to transport cacao, the main form of wealth in the region and a major axis of the economy during the 18th and 19th centuries.

It descends by the valley of the Cariongo, leaves by the big hole of Pamplona and follows towards the northwest, until the height of Chinácota, receives waters of the Honda gorge and continues lowering until the valley of Cúcuta, through where it happens tired, and when leaving it is joined with the Táchira, until ending at the mighty Zulia river, that throws them to the lake of Maracaibo. Most of his course one occurs to 150 ms on the level of the sea.

Its river basin is located on the eastern mountain range, extending by the southwest of north of Santander, from Pamplona to Puerto Santander.
In the 1960s, the World Health Organization worked with national health officials to extend clean water supplies to Pamplona.

Amigos del Río (River Friends) for the Pamplonita River at Cucuta, works to rehabilitate and improve the river.

References

Cúcuta
Rivers of Colombia
Geography of Norte de Santander Department